David Monas Maloney (March 15, 1912 – February 15, 1995) was an American prelate of the Roman Catholic Church. He served as bishop of the Diocese of Wichita in Kansas from 1967 to 1982.  He previously served as an auxiliary bishop of what was then the Diocese of Denver in Colorado from 1960 to 1967.

Biography

Early life 
One of eight children, David Maloney was born on March 15, 1912, in Littleton, Colorado, to James Edward and Margaret (née Flynn) Maloney. James Maloney was an engineer who twice served as mayor of LittletonAfter graduating from Littleton High School, Maloney studied at the University of Colorado (1929–1930) and at St. Thomas Seminary in Denver, obtaining a Bachelor of Arts degree in 1933. He then earned a Licentiate of Sacred Theology from the Pontifical Gregorian University  in Rome in 1937. 

Maloney was ordained to the priesthood for the Diocese of Denver by Cardinal Francesco Selvaggiani on December 8, 1936. In 1940, he earned a doctorate in canon law from the Pontifical Roman Athenaeum S. Apollinare. Upon his return to Colorado in 1940, he served as a curate at St. Philomena Parish in Denver.  In 1943, Maloney was appointed secretary to Bishop Urban Vehr and assistant chancellor of the diocese. He became chancellor in 1954.

Auxiliary Bishop of Denver 
On November 5, 1960, Maloney was appointed as an auxiliary bishop of the Archdiocese of Denver and Titular Bishop of Ruspae by Pope John XXIII. He received his episcopal consecration on January 4, 1961, from Archbishop Egidio Vagnozzi, with Bishops Urban Vehr and Hubert Newell serving as co-consecrators. Representing the ailing Archbishop Vehr, Maloney attended all four sessions of the Second Vatican Council in Rome between 1962 and 1965.

Bishop of Wichita 
Maloney was named the fifth bishop of the Diocese of Wichita by Pope Paul VI on December 2, 1967. In 1969, he joined other Catholic bishops in Kansas in opposing changes in state law that proposed allowing physicians to perform abortions in licensed and accredited hospitals. In 1977, he publicly declared that he would defy a city ordinance that prohibited discrimination in employment, housing and public accommodations based on sexual orientation.

On July 16, 1982, Pope John Paul II accepted Maloney's resignation as bishop of the Diocese of Wichita. David Maloney died at St. Francis Regional Medical Center in Wichita on February 15, 1995, at age 82.

References

1912 births
1995 deaths
University of Colorado alumni
St. Thomas Seminary (Colorado) alumni
People from Littleton, Colorado
Roman Catholic Archdiocese of Denver
Participants in the Second Vatican Council
Roman Catholic bishops of Wichita
20th-century Roman Catholic bishops in the United States
Religious leaders from Colorado
Catholics from Colorado